The Stagmomantinae are a subfamily of mantids within the family Mantidae, found in the Americas.

Tribes and Genera
The Mantodea Species File lists five genera in two tribes:

Antemnini
Antemna Stal, 1877
Hondurantemna Rodrigues, Rivera, Reid & Svenson, 2017

Stagmomantini
Phasmomantis Saussure, 1869
Stagmomantis Saussure, 1869
Tauromantis Giglio-Tos, 1917

References

 
Mantidae
Mantodea subfamilies